Andy Warren may refer to:
 Andy Warren (British musician) (born 1958), English bassist
 Andy Warren (Canadian musician), Canadian independent musician
 Andrew Warren (born  1968), author and CIA operative
 Andrew Warren (geographer) (born 1937), British physical geographer
 Andrew Warren (Home and Away), fictional character in the Australian soap opera Home and Away